You Know How to Love Me is the fourth album by American soul singer-songwriter Phyllis Hyman. It was released by Arista Records in 1979, and produced by James Mtume & Reggie Lucas.

Reception

Writing in Smash Hits, Bev Hillier described You Know How to Love Me as a "great album" that was "relaxing, pleasant, easy listening and anything similar that you can think of". Hillier went on to describe Hyman's voice as "amazing and perfectly used".

According to the Allmusic review by Jose F. Promis, "The album never truly realized its full potential, but does include the song that would become one of Hyman's signature tunes, "You Know How to Love Me." The song was never a blockbuster hit, but has grown into a classic, covered by artists such as Lisa Stansfield and Robin S". The album reached number ten on the R&B charts in 1980. The single, "You Know How to Love Me" was a club smash reaching number six on the dance charts.

Track listing
All tracks composed by Reggie Lucas and James Mtume; except where indicated.

Side One:
 "You Know How to Love Me" – 7:37
 "Some Way" – 5:13
 "Under Your Spell" – 4:40
 "This Feeling Must Be Love" (William Beard) – 3:48
Side Two: 
 "But I Love You" (Misha Segal, Morgan Ames) – 3:07
 "Heavenly" – 4:33
 "Hold On" (Hubert Eaves III, Tawatha Agee) – 4:15
 "Give a Little More" (Howard Schneider, Larry Alexander, Phyllis Hyman) – 4:07
 "Complete Me" (Brad Catron) – 5:26

CD bonus track
10. "You're the One" (unknown) – 5:24

Personnel
Phyllis Hyman – lead and backing vocals
James Mtume – keyboards, percussion, backing vocals
Reggie Lucas – guitar, backing vocals
Howard King – drums
Ed "Tree" Moore – guitar
Basil Fearrington – bass
Harry Whitaker, Hubert Eaves III – keyboards
Ed Walsh – synthesizer programming
Gary Bartz - saxophone on "Give a Little More" and "Complete Me"
Gwen Guthrie, Syndi Jordan, Tawatha Agee – backing vocals
Wade Marcus – string and horn arrangements
Technical
Larkin Arnold - executive producer
John Ford - cover photography

Charts

Singles

References

External links
 

1979 albums
Arista Records albums
Phyllis Hyman albums
Albums arranged by Wade Marcus